(John) Drummond Allison (1921 – 2 December 1943) was an English war poet of the Second World War.

He was born in Caterham, Surrey, and educated at Bishop's Stortford College and at  Queen's College, Oxford. After training at the Royal Military College, Sandhurst, he became an intelligence officer in the East Surrey Regiment. He served in North Africa and Italy, where he was killed in action fighting on the Garigliano. Lieutenant Allison is buried in the Minturno War Cemetery.

Works
The Yellow Night: Poems 1940-41-42-43 (1944)
The Poems of Drummond Allison (1978) edited by Michael Sharp
The Collected Poems of Drummond Allison (1993) edited by Stephen Benson

Notes

References
 Drummond Allison: Come, Let Us Pity Death, by Ross Davies (London:Cecil Woolf Publishers)  .

1921 births
1943 deaths
Alumni of The Queen's College, Oxford
East Surrey Regiment officers
British Army personnel killed in World War II
Graduates of the Royal Military College, Sandhurst
People educated at Bishop's Stortford College
People from Caterham
20th-century English poets
Military personnel from Surrey
English male poets